Cordero Atado is the seventh album by Argentine rock band Patricio Rey y sus Redonditos de Ricota, released in 1993.

Background 
After the incidents at the Estadio Obras, the band played two gigs in 1992, the first was in Lanús in May, the second at the Teatro San Martín of Mar del Plata in August, the group started to record their next album in early 1993, with Hernán Aramberri as collaborator.

The mixing was made in Miami and was completed in Los Ángeles, United States.

The official presentation of the two albums was at the Estadio Huracán in 1994 on two dates, in front of 80,000 fans.

Track listing 
All songs written by Solari/Beilinson.

Personnel 
Patricio Rey
Indio Solari - Lead Vocals.
Skay Beilinson - Guitars.
Semilla Bucciarelli - Bass guitar.
Walter Sidotti - Drums.
Sergio Dawi - Saxophone.

Guests
Guillermo "Dedos Brujos" Piccolini - Keyboards on "Caña seca y un membrillo".
Barry Brodsky - Backing vocals on "Lavi-rap".
Hernán Aramberri - Effects and samplers.

Additional personnel 
Mario Breuer: Engineer.
Barry Brodsky: Engineer.
Poly and Heidi: Executive producer.
Rocambole, Semilla Bucciarelli and Meroyuela: Art and design.

References 

Patricio Rey y sus Redonditos de Ricota albums
1993 albums